It Is Not Evening Yet is a 1974 Soviet drama film directed by Nikolai Rozantsev.

Plot 
The film tells about a girl who went to the factory and worked there all her life.

Cast 
 Inna Makarova as Inna Kovalyova
 Kirill Lavrov as Andrey Pavlov
 Rita Gladunko as Tamara Shevyakova
 Galina Galchenko as Sveta Pavlova
 Rimma Markova as Zinaida Voronina
 Olga Markina as Aleksandra Zhigalkina
 Lyubov Malinovskaya as Polya
 Anna Tveleneva as Lyuba (as Anna Tvelenyova)
 Larisa Burkova as Valya
 Liliya Gurova as Klava Semykina

References

External links 
 

1974 films
1970s Russian-language films
Soviet drama films
Films set in Russia
Films shot in Nizhny Novgorod
1974 drama films